The Carlen House, also known as the Carlen House Museum, is a historic house museum in Mobile, Alabama, United States.  The house was built in the Gulf Coast cottage style in 1843.  It was the residence of Michael and Mary Carlen, Irish immigrants, and their twelve children.   Operated as a farm during the 19th century, the Mobile County School Board acquired  of the property from the Carlen family in 1923 as the site for a new public city school.  As a result, the house is now on the northern edge of the Murphy High School campus.  It was placed on the National Register of Historic Places on June 12, 1981.

The house is currently not open to the public, however is used by the Murphy High School students on occasion.

References

National Register of Historic Places in Mobile, Alabama
Houses on the National Register of Historic Places in Alabama
Houses in Mobile, Alabama
Houses completed in 1843
Defunct museums in Alabama
Gulf Coast cottage architecture in Alabama
1843 establishments in Alabama